Vila may refer to:

People
Vila (surname)

Places

Andorra
 Vila, Andorra, a town in the parish of Encamp

Brazil
 Vila Bela da Santíssima Trindade, a municipality in the State of Mato Grosso
 Vila Boa, Goiás, a municipality in the State of Goiás
 Vila Flores, a municipality in Rio Grande do Sul
 Vila Flor, a municipality in Rio Grande do Norte
 Vila Lângaro, a municipality in Rio Grande do Sul
 Vila Maria (district of São Paulo), a municipality in Rio Grande do Sul
 Vila Nova do Piauí, a municipality of Piauí
 Vila Nova dos Martírios, a municipality of Maranhão
 Vila Nova do Sul, a municipality in Rio Grande do Sul
 Vila Pavão, a municipality in Espírito Santo
 Vila Propício, a municipality in the State of Goiás
 Vila Rica, a municipality in the State of Minas Gerais
 Vila Valério, a municipality in Espírito Santo
 Vila Velha, a municipality in Espírito Santo

Estonia
 Vila, Estonia, village in the parish of Vihula, country of Lääne-Viru

Mozambique
 Vila Pery, former name of the city of Chimoio

Portugal
 Vila (Melgaço), a civil parish in the municipality of Melgaço
 Vila do Bispo, a municipality in the district of Faro
 Vila do Conde, a municipality in the district of Porto
 Vila Franca de Xira, a municipality in the district of Lisbon
 Vila Nova de Famalicão, a municipality in the district of Braga
 Vila Nova de Gaia, a municipality in the district of Porto
 Vila Real, a municipality of district of Vila Real
 Vila Real de Santo António Municipality, a municipality in the district of Faro

Archipelago of the Azores 
 Vila Franca do Campo (Azores), a municipality on the island of São Miguel
 Vila do Porto (Azores), a municipality on the island of Santa Maria

Solomon Islands
 Vila, Solomon Islands, a site at the southern end of Kolombangara (Solomon Islands); notable as the site of a Japanese airstrip in World War II

Spain
 La Vila Joiosa (known as La Vila), municipality and capital of the comarca of Marina Baixa, Spain
 Vila-real, municipality of the province of Castellón, Spain
 Vila d'Eivissa (known in English as "Ibiza Town"), capital of Ibiza Island, Spain
 Vila de Cruces, municipality of Pontevedra, Spain

Vanuatu
 Port Vila, capital of Vanuatu

Other
 Vila (album), a 2009 album by Emina Jahović
 Vila (butterfly), a butterfly genus
 Vila (fairy), nymphs in Slavic mythology
 Vila Restal, fictional character from the television serial Blake's 7
 Dalmat (yacht), which carried the name Vila between 1943 and 1945

See also
 Vilas (disambiguation)
 Villa, originally an ancient Roman upper-class country house
 Villas (disambiguation)